Meetinghouse Green Road Cemetery is a historic cemetery located at Meetinghouse Green in Herkimer County, New York.  It was established about 1801 and contains about 140 marked burials.  The most recent burial dates to 1967.  Headstones include simple grave markers through large and ornate carved and cast monuments.

It was listed on the National Register of Historic Places in 2013.

References

Cemeteries on the National Register of Historic Places in New York (state)
1801 establishments in New York (state)
Buildings and structures in Herkimer County, New York
National Register of Historic Places in Herkimer County, New York